The  Spokane Shock season was the ninth season for the franchise, and their fifth in the Arena Football League. The team was coached by Andy Olson and played their home games at the Spokane Veterans Memorial Arena. With an 11–7 regular season record, the Shock advanced to the playoffs. However, they were defeated in the conference semifinals by the San Jose SaberCats by a 55–28 score.

Standings

Schedule

Regular season
The Shock opened the season against the Iowa Barnstormers at home on March 15. Their last regular season game was on the road against the Portland Thunder on July 26.

Playoffs

Roster

References

Spokane Shock
Spokane Shock seasons
Spokane Shock